The Sweet Sex and Love is a 2003 South Korean erotic romance film. It was directed by Bong Man-dae and starred Kim Sung-soo and Kim Seo-hyung. The entire score was based on a digitally remastered recording of the works of Bedřich Smetana.

Cast 
 Kim Sung-soo
Kim Seo-hyung

External links 
 
 

2003 films
2000s Korean-language films
South Korean erotic romance films
2000s South Korean films